Daskon (lit. Daskon, the Fire of Kandy; also known as ) is a Sri Lankan drama starring Roshan Ravindra as the titular character Daskon, Pooja Umashankar and Akila Dhanuddhara. Directed and written by Jackson Anthony, this historical drama depicts the legendary romance between Queen Pramila, the queen consort of king Vira Parackrama Narendrasinghe and Minister Daskon.  It aired on Swarnavahini every Saturday and Sunday at 20:30 (SLST) from September 6, 2014 to July 5, 2015.

Synopsis 
About the tragic love story between real life Daskon (Pedro de Gascoyn), the chief minister of king Vira Parackrama Narendrasinghe and the king’s queen consort Sumitra (Pramila Devi). Vira Parackrama Narendrasinghe was the last king of Kandy with Sinhalese origin. The story flows through various power struggles and conspiracies in the court.

Cast 

Roshan Ravindra as Daskon
Pooja Umashankar as Queen Pramila
Akila Dhanuddhara as King Vira Parackrama Narendrasinghe
Menaka Pieris as Monaravila Kumarihami
Gihan Fernando as Pattiya Bandara
Dinusha Rajapathirana as Kiribakini
Avanti Aponsu as dowager queen mother
Kusum Renu as Abhirami Devi
Ruwan Perera as Suragune
Srimal Wedisinghe as Pitti Nayakkar
Roshan Pilapitiya
Sathischandra Edirisinghe
Buddhadasa Vithanarachchi
Chandika Nanayakkara 
Lucien Bulathsinhala
Hyacinth Wijeratne
Kumari Munasinghe
 Richard Abeywardena as Kiriwavule Rala

Awards and nominations

References

External links 
Daskon Official Swarnavahini website

Sinhala-language television
2014 Sri Lankan television series debuts
2015 Sri Lankan television series endings
2010s Sri Lankan television series
Swarnavahini original programming
Sri Lankan historical television series
Television shows set in Sri Lanka
Sri Lankan television shows
Sri Lankan drama television series
Television series about the history of Sri Lanka